Jesper Svensson (born 15 February 1995) is a Swedish professional bowler. He has been a member of the Professional Bowlers Association (PBA) since 2014, and also competes on the European Bowling Tour (EBT). He has won eleven PBA Tour titles overall, including a major title at the 2016 PBA Tournament of Champions. He also owns six EBT titles and one PBA Regional title. He is known for using the two-handed shovel style delivery with a dominant left hand. He uses non-reactive urethane bowling balls almost exclusively. Svensson is a member of the Storm and Vise Grips pro staffs.

During the 2017 PBA season, ESPN and CBS Sports Network bowling analyst Randy Pedersen gave Svensson the nickname Iceman for the Swede's cool, calm demeanor under pressure.

Amateur accomplishments
Before turning pro, Svensson was the 2014 World Youth Masters champion, and won numerous other medals in World Youth competition.

PBA career

2015 season
Svensson won his first career PBA Tour title at the 2015 PBA-WBT Kingdom of Bahrain Open on March 7.  He followed that up with a win in the PBA Chameleon Championship at the PBA World Series of Bowling on December 18. Svensson was honored as the 2015 PBA Rookie of the Year.

2016 season
Having qualified for his very first PBA Tournament of Champions, Svensson won the event held in Shawnee, Oklahoma on February 7, 2016. In doing so at age 20, he became the youngest-ever winner in this PBA major tournament, which dates back to 1962. Marshall Holman had previously held this distinction when he won the 1976 Tournament of Champions at age 21. Svensson won two more PBA titles in 2016, at the Brunswick Euro Challenge (Munich) and the World Bowling Tour Thailand event (Bangkok), giving him five PBA titles overall.

2017 season
Svensson's sixth PBA title came on April 16, 2017 in the Mark Roth-Marshall Holman PBA Doubles Championship, where he teamed with right-handed two-hander Kyle Troup for the title. As one of the top eight money leaders from the start of the 2015 season through the 2017 USBC Masters, Svensson was invited to participate in the inaugural Main Event PBA Tour Finals in May, 2017. Jesper placed third in the event. On November 19, Svensson won his seventh PBA Tour title in the PBA Cheetah Championship, part of the World Series of Bowling in Reno, NV.

2018 season
Svensson qualified as the #1 seed in the 2018 PBA Tournament of Champions, but finished runner-up after losing the title match to Matt O'Grady. He was a member of the Go Bowling! Silver Lake Atom Splitters team, which won the PBA League event on April 22, 2018.

2019 season
Svensson won his eighth PBA Tour title at the PBA-WBT Thailand Open. After qualifying as the top seed, Jesper defeated American Sean Rash in the final match.

2020 season
On February 29, Svensson won his ninth PBA Tour title at the 2020 Roth-Holman Doubles Championship held in Indianapolis with doubles partner Kyle Troup. This was the second doubles title for the Svensson-Troup duo, who previously won the event in 2017. Later that day, Svensson won the 2020 PBA Indianapolis Open. As the #1 seed for the stepladder finals, he defeated Shawn Maldonado in the championship match 245–226 to claim his tenth PBA Tour title, which now makes him title-eligible for the PBA Hall of Fame.

2021 season
Svensson was winless in the 2021 PBA Tour season.

2022 season
On February 9, 2022, Svensson won his eleventh PBA Tour title in the David Small's Best of the Best Championship, held in Jackson, Michigan. Having qualified as the top seed, he defeated fellow lefty Packy Hanrahan in his lone finals match by a score of 248–216 to claim the victory.

In the 2022 PBA Playoffs, the 14th-seeded Svensson stunned #3 seed E. J. Tackett two points to one to advance to the Round of 8. He was then defeated by #6 seed Tommy Jones, also by a two points to one score.

PBA Tour titles 
Major tournament wins are in bold text.

 2015 PBA-WBT Kingdom of Bahrain Open (Bahrain)
 2015 PBA Chameleon Championship (Reno, NV)
 2016 PBA Tournament of Champions (Shawnee, OK)
 2016 Brunswick Euro Challenge (Munich, Germany)
 2016 World Bowling Tour Thailand (Bangkok)
 2017 Mark Roth-Marshall Holman PBA Doubles Championship w/Kyle Troup (Portland, ME)
 2017 PBA Cheetah Championship (Reno, NV)
 2019 PBA-WBT Thailand Open (Bangkok)
 2020 Mark Roth-Marshall Holman PBA Doubles Championship w/Kyle Troup (Indianapolis, IN)
 2020 PBA Indianapolis Open (Indianapolis, IN)
 2022 David Small's Best of the Best Championship (Jackson, MI)

Professional accomplishments and records 
 2015 PBA Rookie of the Year
 Youngest-ever winner in the PBA Tournament of Champions (20 years, 357 days)
 First player to have five PBA Tour titles by age 21 (joined by Anthony Simonsen in 2018)
 Named Sweden's 2016 Rookie Sportsman of the Year
 2016 PBA George Young High Average Award winner (226.07 average over 324 PBA Tour games)

World Series of Bowling

Wins (2)

Results timeline
Results not in chronological order.

"T" = Tied for a place

PBA career statistics
Statistics are through the last complete PBA season.

+CRA = Championship Round Appearances

Personal
In addition to bowling, Svensson enjoys soccer and ice hockey.

References 

Swedish ten-pin bowling players
1995 births
Living people